Terminalia januariensis is a species of plant in the Combretaceae family. It is endemic to the Atlantic Forest ecoregion, in Minas Gerais and Rio de Janeiro states of southeastern Brazil. It is threatened by habitat loss.

References

januariensis
Endemic flora of Brazil
Flora of the Atlantic Forest
Flora of Minas Gerais
Flora of Rio de Janeiro (state)
Vulnerable flora of South America
Taxa named by Augustin Pyramus de Candolle
Taxonomy articles created by Polbot